The 1959–60 Illinois Fighting Illini men’s basketball team represented the University of Illinois.

Regular season
Entering his 13th year as University of Illinois' head coach, Harry Combes and his Fighting Illini basketball team. Started gaining on the national scene once again by beginning the Big Ten season as a top 10 ranked team.  The Associated Press would eventually rank the Illini as high as number eight during the course of the season; however, the team would falter late in the season, dropping three straight games and fall out of the rankings. The final AP and UPI rankings would include only two Big Ten teams, Ohio State (ranked 3) and Indiana (ranked 7/10).  Ohio State would go on and win the NCAA Tournament.  For the second time in the history of the Illini, they would play in a mid-season tournament.  The tournament they would compete in would be the inaugural Los Angeles Basketball Classic held at the Los Angeles Memorial Sports Arena December 28–30.

The 1959-60 team utilized several returning lettermen including the leading scorer and team "MVP" Govoner Vaughn. It also saw the return of team "captain" Mannie Jackson as well as Ed Perry, Lou Landt, John Wessels, Lee Frandsen, Vern Altemeyer, Al Gosnell and Bruce Bunkenberg. Jerry Colangelo, a future sports mogul, also played a significant role as a sophomore.  The Illini finished the season with a conference record of 8 wins and 6 losses, finishing tied for 3rd place in the Big Ten. They would finish with an overall record of 16 wins and 7 losses.  The starting lineup included John Wessels at the center position, Vern Altemeyer, Lou Landt and Mannie Jackson at guard and Govoner Vaughn and Ed Perry at the forward slots.

Roster

Source

Schedule
												
Source																
												

|-
!colspan=12 style="background:#DF4E38; color:white;"| Non-Conference regular season

|-
!colspan=9 style="background:#DF4E38; color:#FFFFFF;"|Big Ten regular season

|-					

Bold Italic connotes conference game

Player stats

Awards and honors
Govoner Vaughn
Converse Honorable Mention All-American
Team Most Valuable Player 
Mannie Jackson
Converse Honorable Mention All-American

Team players drafted into the NBA

Rankings

References

Illinois Fighting Illini
Illinois Fighting Illini men's basketball seasons
1959 in sports in Illinois
1960 in sports in Illinois